Pánuco is a city in the  Mexican state of Veracruz, located in the state's Huasteca Alta region. It serves as the municipal seat of the surrounding Pánuco Municipality. It stands on the banks of the Río Pánuco.

In the 2005 INEGI Census, the city of Pánuco reported a total population of 33,122.

History
Pánuco is traditionally held to have been founded by Hernán Cortés on 22 December 1522, as Villa de Santiesteban del Puerto, the second ayuntamiento on the American continent. It was the capital of the Province of Pánuco in the early colonial period. It was given city status on 30 June 1931.

Hernando de Soto's 1541 expedition stopped in Panuco after his death.

On April 23, 1900, Pánuco was destroyed by fire, leaving more than 2,000 homeless.

References

Populated places in Veracruz
Pánuco River
Populated places established in 1522